is a 1956 black-and-white Japanese film directed by Kazuo Mori.

Cast
 Ichikawa Raizō VIII
 Michiko Saga
 Tamao Nakamura
 Saburo Date

References

External links

Japanese black-and-white films
1956 films
Films directed by Kazuo Mori
Daiei Film films
1950s Japanese films